There were two repechage positions available in qualification for the 2003 Rugby World Cup. The USA and Tonga would eventually qualify through the two positions. Russia had originally qualified for Repechage as Europe 5, but Russia were ejected from the competition for using ineligible South African players and were replaced by Spain.

The first round was rescheduled as a single match at a neutral site due to logistical issues caused by delays resulting from the investigation and subsequent ejection of Russia.

Repechage 1

Round 1
Spain advanced to Round 2.

Round 2
USA qualified to Pool B of the 2003 Rugby World Cup as Repechage 1.

Repechage 2
Tonga qualified to Pool D of the 2003 Rugby World Cup as Repechage 2.

2003
Repechage
World Cup
2003 in South Korean sport
2003 in Tunisian sport
World Cup
World Cup